Sir Donald McCullin  (born 9 October 1935) is a British photojournalist, particularly recognised for his war photography and images of urban strife. His career, which began in 1959, has specialised in examining the underside of society, and his photographs have depicted the unemployed, downtrodden and  impoverished.

Early life 
McCullin was born in St Pancras, London, and grew up in Finsbury Park, but he was evacuated to a farm in Somerset during the Blitz. He has mild dyslexia but displayed a talent for drawing at the secondary modern school he attended. He won a scholarship to Hammersmith School of Arts and Crafts but, following the death of his father, he left school at the age of 15, without qualifications, for a catering job on the railways. He was then called up for National Service with the Royal Air Force (RAF) in 1953.

Photojournalism 
During his National Service, McCullin was posted to the Suez Canal during the 1956 Suez Crisis, and served as a photographer's assistant. He failed the written theory paper to become a photographer in the RAF and spent his service in the darkroom. During this period McCullin bought his first camera, a Rolleicord, for £30 when stationed in Nairobi. On return to Britain, shortage of funds led to his pawning the camera and his mother used her money to redeem the pledge.

In 1958 he took a photograph of a local London gang posing in a bombed-out building. He was persuaded by his colleagues to take his photograph of The Guvnors, as the gang was known, to The Observer, which published it, setting him on his path as a photographer. Between 1966 and 1984, he worked as an overseas correspondent for the Sunday Times Magazine, recording ecological and man-made catastrophes such as wars, amongst them Biafra in 1968, and victims of the African AIDS epidemic. His hard-hitting coverage of the Vietnam War and the Northern Ireland conflict is held in particularly high regard.

He also took the photographs of Maryon Park in London used in Michelangelo Antonioni's 1966 film Blowup, In 1968, his Nikon camera stopped a bullet intended for him. Also in 1968, on 28 July, he was invited to photograph the Beatles, then at the height of their fame and in the midst of recording The White Album. These sessions, made at several London locations, have become known as The Mad Day Out. They contain many well-known images of the band, including the gatefold sleeve picture from the Red and Blue compilations where the Beatles mingled with the crowd seen through railings. The photographs from this day were published in the 2010 book A Day in the Life of the Beatles.

A documentary about McCullin entitled Just One More War, directed by Jana Boková, with ATV as the production company, aired on the ITV network in 1977.

In 1982 the British government refused to grant McCullin a press pass to cover the Falklands War, claiming the boat was full. At the time he believed it was because the Thatcher government felt his images might be too disturbing politically.

He is the author of a number of books, including The Palestinians (with Jonathan Dimbleby, 1980), Beirut: A City in Crisis (1983) and Don McCullin in Africa (2005). His book, Shaped by War (2010) was published to accompany a retrospective exhibition at the Imperial War Museum North, Salford, England in 2010 and then at the Victoria Art Gallery, Bath and the Imperial War Museum, London. His most recent publication is Southern Frontiers: A Journey Across the Roman Empire, a poetic and contemplative study of selected Roman and pre-Roman ruins in North Africa and the Middle East.

In 2012, a documentary film of his life, McCullin, directed by David Morris and Jacqui Morris, was released. It was nominated for two BAFTA awards. In later years, McCullin has turned to landscape, still-life works and commissioned portraits. In November 2015 McCullin was named Photo London Master of Photography for 2016, at the launch of Photo London, an art fair due to open at Somerset House in May 2016. A special exhibition dedicated to his work is to be commissioned. Asked about the rise of digital photography, he said: "Digital photography can be a totally lying experience – you can move what you want. The whole thing can't be trusted really".

Filmed in February 2018 and broadcast in May, the BBC Four documentary The Road To Palmyra saw McCullin visit Syria with historian Dan Cruickshank to see the devastation left by the conflict on the UNESCO listed site of Palmyra. Discussing his trip with the Radio Times he spoke of his approach to entering war zones: "I have risked my life endless times, and ended up in hospital with all kinds of burns and shell wounds. I have those reptile eyes that see behind and in front of me. I'm constantly trying to stay alive. I'm aware of warfare, of hidden mines."

Despite his reputation as a war photographer, McCullin has said that Alfred Stieglitz was a key influence on his work.

Personal life
Living in Somerset, he is married and has five children from his marriages.

Biopic
In November 2020, it was announced Angelina Jolie would be directing a biopic about McCullin, with Tom Hardy in the starring role. It is being adapted from McCullin's autobiography Unreasonable Behaviour by Gregory Burke.

Publications 

 
 
 
 
 
 
 
 
 
 
 
 
 
 
 
 
 
 
 
 Don McCullin (2010) A Day in the Life of the Beatles. London: Jonathan Cape. . New York: Rizzoli. .
A day in the life of the Beatles: un giorno speciale con John, Paul, George e Ringo. Milan: Rizzoli. .
A day in the life of the Beatles: söndagen den 28 juli 1968. Stockholm: Max Ström. .
 The Landscape. London: Jonathan Cape, 2018. .

 Awards 

 1964: World Press Photo of the Year, Amsterdam, for his coverage of the war in Cyprus.
 1964: Photo Stories, third prize stories, World Press Photo award, Amsterdam.
 1964: Warsaw Gold Medal.
 1974: News Picture, first prize stories, World Press Photo award 1973, Amsterdam.
 1977: Honorary Fellowship of the Royal Photographic Society (HonFRPS).
 1978: Photo Stories, first prize stories, World Press Photo award 1977, Amsterdam.
 1984: Spot News, second prize stories, World Press Photo award 1983, Amsterdam.
 1993: Honorary doctorate from the University of Bradford.
 1993: Appointed Commander of the Order of the British Empire in the 1993 New Year Honours, the first photojournalist to receive the honour.
 1994: Honorary degree from the Open University.
 2003: Royal Photographic Society's Special 150th Anniversary Medal and Honorary Fellowship (HonFRPS) in recognition of a sustained, significant contribution to the art of photography.
 2006: Cornell Capa Award.
 2007: Royal Photographic Society's Centenary Medal.
 2008: Honorary Doctorate of Letters by the University of Gloucestershire in recognition of his lifetime's achievement in photojournalism.
 2009: Honorary Fellowship of Hereford College of Arts.
 2011: Honorary Degree (Doctor of Arts) from the University of Bath.
 2016: Lucie Award in Achievement in Photojournalism category
2017: Appointed Knight Bachelor in the 2017 New Year Honours for services to photography.
2017:  Honorary Degree (Doctor of Letters) from the University of Exeter.

Exhibitions
2010–2012: Shaped by War: Photographs by Don McCullin, Imperial War Museum North, Salford, UK, 2010; Victoria Art Gallery, Bath, UK, 2010; Imperial War Museum, London, 2011–2012 in an updated form."Shaped by War: Photographs by Don McCullin: 7 October 2011 – 15 April 2012" Imperial War Museum. Accessed 2 May 2018. A retrospective with Photographs, contact sheets, objects, magazines and personal memorabilia.
2013: Retrospective, National Gallery of Canada, Ottawa, Canada.
2019: Retrospective, Tate Britain, London, UK
2020-2021: Retrospective, Tate Liverpool (Exhibition extended to September 2021 as a result of COVID-19 related closures earlier in the year), Liverpool, UK

Collections
McCullin's work is held in the following permanent collection:
Tate, UK: 85 prints as of May 2018
Victoria and Albert Museum, London: 11 prints
National Portrait Gallery, London: 18 prints

 Quotes 

"I grew up in total ignorance, poverty and bigotry, and this has been a burden for me throughout my life. There is still some poison that won't go away, as much as I try to drive it out."
"I am a professed atheist, until I find myself in serious circumstances. Then I quickly fall on my knees, in my mind if not literally, and I say : 'Please God, save me from this.'"
"I have been manipulated, and I have in turn manipulated others, by recording their response to suffering and misery. So there is guilt in every direction: guilt because I don't practise religion, guilt because I was able to walk away, while this man was dying of starvation or being murdered by another man with a gun. And I am tired of guilt, tired of saying to myself: "I didn't kill that man on that photograph, I didn't starve that child." That's why I want to photograph landscapes and flowers. I am sentencing myself to peace."
"Photography for me is not looking, it's feeling. If you can't feel what you're looking at, then you're never going to get others to feel anything when they look at your pictures."

 References 

 External links 

Don McCullin at Hamiltons Gallery
Life Interrupted: A gallery from Africa on behalf of Christian Aid
Audio slideshow on BBC News
TateShots: Don McCullin The artist on his work (podcast by Tate Britain) (registration required)
Don McCullin at tate.org.uk
Photographs from the Shaped by War exhibition at The Guardian "Don McCullin: the art of seeing" at The Guardian''

1935 births
People from St Pancras, London
British autobiographers
Photographers from London
Commanders of the Order of the British Empire
English photojournalists
The Sunday Times photojournalists
The Observer photojournalists
Living people
Vietnam War photographers
Photography in India
Photography in Lebanon
War photographers
Social documentary photographers
British male writers
Knights Bachelor
People from Finsbury Park
Male non-fiction writers